Sir George Brian Hugh Dillon (2 October 1925 – 22 June 2003) was a British lawyer and judge who served as a Lord Justice of Appeal from 1982 to 1994.

Biography 
Dillon was born in a naval family, the son of Captain George Crozier Dillon, RN, and the grandson of an admiral. He was educated at Winchester College, where he was a scholar, before proceeding to New College, Oxford, also as a scholar. Initially reading Classics, he switched to law, before joining the Royal Naval Volunteer Reserve in 1943, training at HMS Ganges before serving in the Far East abroad the destroyer HMS Tyrian.

Returning to Oxford after the war, he was called to the bar by Lincoln's Inn in 1948, and acquired a "huge practice" at the Chancery bar. He took silk in 1965 and became head of chambers.

He was appointed a judge of the High Court of Justice, in 1979, assigned to the Chancery Division and received the customary knighthood. He was promoted to the Court of Appeal in 1982, and was sworn of the Privy Council. He retired in 1994.

Family 
Dillon married Alison Lane in 1954; they had two sons and two daughters.

Selected judgments
Lord Justice Dillon's reported cases include:

Notcutt v Universal Equipment Co (London) Ltd [1986] ICR 414
R & B Customs Brokers Co Ltd v United Dominions Trust Ltd [1988] 1 WLR 321
Interfoto Picture Library Ltd v Stiletto Visual Programmes Ltd [1989] QB 433
Hunter v Moss [1994] 1 WLR 452
Vaughan v Barlow Clowes International Ltd [1991] EWCA Civ 11 - English trusts law, concerning tracing
Powdrill v Watson
Re Sevenoaks Stationers (Retail) Ltd
Harris v Goddard
Bishopsgate Investment Management Ltd v Homan [1994] EWCA Civ 33 - English trusts law, whether a beneficiary whose fiduciary breaches trust, may trace assets through an overdrawn account to its destination.
Abbey National Building Society v Cann
Multinational Gas and Petrochemical Co v Multinational Gas and Petrochemical Services Ltd
Alec Lobb (Garages) Ltd v Total Oil (GB) Ltd
Fitzpatrick v British Railways Board [1992] ICR 221, [1992] IRLR 376 - UK labour law, concerning collective bargaining
Nestle v National Westminster Bank plc [1992] EWCA Civ 12, [1993] 1 WLR 1260 - English trusts law case concerning the duty of care when a trustee is making an investment.

Footnotes

References

 Obituary - Daily Telegraph

20th-century English judges
1925 births
2003 deaths
Alumni of New College, Oxford
People educated at Sandroyd School
People educated at Winchester College
Members of the Privy Council of the United Kingdom
Knights Bachelor
Lords Justices of Appeal
Chancery Division judges
Royal Naval Volunteer Reserve personnel of World War II